Destruction Comes is the third album by Vengeance Rising released in 1991. The album was the first album to not feature any members of the original members other than Vocalist Roger Martinez, who recorded Bass and Rhythm Guitar. The other members that were on the album were Derek Sean, who recorded Guitars on Mortification's self titled album, and Chris Hyde, former drummer of Deliverance and Holy Soldier. The album was re-released on Intense Millennium Records in 2011.

Critical reception

The album was reviewed by Harvest Rock Syndicate, Heaven's Metal and YouthWorker in the years 1991-1992. The website "Classic Thrash" wrote "After some radical line-up changes Vengeance Rising were back with only Roger Martinez left of the original group, which probably had a serious impact on the new album. Destruction Comes demonstrates a much more streamlined sound with very little of the previous variety left. It is unarguably quite a lot more one-dimensional in comparison to the old, even considering that the new band were able to maintain a constant speed in a respectable way. Everything pretty much follows the same formula, complete with nearly identical tempo and vocals on almost every track. After the first couple of songs have passed you effectively fail to notice any real difference between the rest, and by the end of the album you've probably given up paying any attention a long time ago. Maybe Destruction Comes is not a total loss after all, but it can be surprisingly tiresome to listen to it even halfway through." Cross Rhythms writer Tony Cummings gave the album a two out of ten, stating "Vengeance Rising (originally Vengeance) were quite the white metal team everyone was talking about, but after a sparkling debut album was followed by a pretty dire one, they now complete the decline with an album which has all the noise and aggression but none of the subtlety."

Track listing

Personnel
Vengeance
 Roger Martinez - vocals, bass, rhythm guitar, producer, mixing
 Derek Sean - lead guitar
 Chris Hyde - drums

Production
 Eddie Schryer - mastering
 Gil Morales - engineer, mixing
 Craig Brock - assistant engineer
 Brandon Harris - assistant engineer

References

1991 albums
Vengeance Rising albums
Frontline Records albums